Rodale, Inc., was an American publisher of health and wellness magazines, books, and digital properties headquartered in Emmaus, Pennsylvania, with a satellite office in New York City. The company was founded in 1930. In 2017, it was acquired by New York City-based Hearst Communications, a media conglomerate.

The company launched and published health and wellness lifestyle magazines, including Men's Health and Prevention, and books, including the bestsellers An Inconvenient Truth by Al Gore and Eat This, Not That by health writer David Zinczenko.

History 
Rodale Inc. was founded in 1930 by J. I. Rodale. He was a partner with his brother, Joseph, in Rodale Manufacturing, which produced electrical switches. Joseph moved Rodale Manufacturing to Emmaus, Pennsylvania to take advantage of favorable local taxes, while J. I. dabbled in publishing. In 1942, Rodale started Organic Farming and Gardening magazine. It taught people how to grow food with organic farming techniques. Today, Organic Gardening is the best-read gardening magazine in the world. In 1950, Rodale introduced Prevention, a health magazine.

In 1971, J. I. Rodale died during a taping of The Dick Cavett Show, and his son, Robert Rodale (1930–1990), took over the company’s leadership. On September 20, 1990, Robert Rodale was killed in a car accident during a business trip in Russia.

In 1972, Rodale Press was one of the five founding members of the International Federation of Organic Agriculture Movements (IFOAM) (now IFOAM–Organics International), founded at Versailles, France.

Following Robert Rodale's death, his wife, Ardath Harter Rodale (1928–2009), became chairman and chief executive officer of the company. In 2000, Steven Pleshette Murphy joined the company as president and chief operating officer, and was named president and CEO in 2002. On June 18, 2007, Ardath Rodale stepped down as chairman, and her daughter, Maria, was named chairman. Ardath remained a member of the company’s board and took over the new title of Chief Inspiration Officer. On September 1, 2009, Murphy stepped down as President and CEO. Maria Rodale, granddaughter of company founder J.I. Rodale and daughter of previous chairpersons Robert Rodale and Ardath Rodale, succeeded Murphy as CEO.

Sale to Hearst 
In October 2017, New York–based Hearst Communications announced it would acquire the magazine and book businesses of Rodale. The transaction was expected to close in January following government approvals. Rodale announced some months prior that it would consider a total sale of the company, among other alternatives explored by its board of directors. It hired financial adviser Allen & Co. to lead the search for bidders. According to a source familiar with the negotiations, Hearst outbid Meredith Corporation, another large media company that had expressed interest in Rodale’s portfolio almost immediately after they solicited offers. After the sale, Hearst sold Rodale's trade publishing division to Crown Publishing Group, part of Penguin Random House.

Imprints
In 2007, Rodale launched Modern Times, an imprint focused on non-fiction, politics, current affairs, and biographical books headed by Leigh Haber, previously of Hyperion. Modern Times was discontinued in 2008. Rodale Kids, a children's imprint, was launched in 2017, and was absorbed into Random House Children's Books in the 2018 sale.

Products

Magazines
 Bicycling
 The Bike Mag
 Men's Health
 Rodale's Organic Life
 Prevention
 Runner's World
 Women's Health

Books
 
 
 
 
 
  
 
 
 Gore, Al (2017). An Inconvenient Sequel: Truth to Power.

News website 
Rodale News' website was launched on Earth Day, April 22, 2009, with the tagline “where health meets green".

See also 
Rodale Institute

References 

 
Book publishing companies based in Pennsylvania
Companies based in Lehigh County, Pennsylvania
Emmaus, Pennsylvania
American companies established in 1930
1930 establishments in Pennsylvania
American companies disestablished in 2017
2017 disestablishments in Pennsylvania